Gauntlet: Seven Sorrows is the follow-up to Gauntlet Legends and Gauntlet Dark Legacy.  It uses fantasy fighting action with the strategic role-playing collecting and customization elements for solo play, co-op and an online community.

Gameplay
The game features the four original heroes: the wizard, the elf, the warrior, and the valkyrie, each wielding many combos and special attacks that can be purchased at the end of each world removing the dull look of a single attack and adding a nice level of detail. Unlike the previous Gauntlet game, Gauntlet Dark Legacy, there are only four characters, with no unlockable hidden characters and no character appearance customization available. There is also no longer a central hub world where players can upgrade their characters and choose which world to enter next. Upgrading is instead done at the end of each world, and cannot be accessed from the menu, nor is there a shop where items can be purchased.

Plot
Centuries ago, four immortal heroes were gathered together to serve the emperor. He trusted their advice, but sought their immortality, and so his six great advisors used this against him, and tricked him into crucifying the heroes on a great tree at the bottom of the world. Afterwards the emperor regretted this act, and yet committed six other sorrows before he was killed by his trusted advisors. However, before his death he undid his first great sorrow and released his loyal heroes from the tree. Mysteriously set free, the heroes now must set out to destroy the emperor's twisted advisors, transformed into monstrous creatures by stealing the heroes immortality, and set right the emperor's six other sorrows. If the ancient heroes cannot undo the emperor's deeds on their own, his mad plans may tear apart the world. The heroes set out to destroy the emperor, but there are some complications and all their powers are taken away, from there, it is up to the player to gain the powers back and destroy the emperor.

Development
Industry veterans John Romero and Josh Sawyer initially spearheaded Midway's San Diego studio, intent on reviving the Gauntlet action role-playing game (RPG) franchise.  Romero and Sawyer both left Midway Games before the completion of this title. The two characters created by Romero and Sawyer, Lancer and Tragedian, were removed from the final game.

Reception

Gauntlet: Seven Sorrows was met with mixed reviews.

References

External links

2005 video games
Cancelled Windows games
Cooperative video games
Dungeon crawler video games
Midway video games
Multiplayer online games
PlayStation 2 games
RenderWare games
Video games about valkyries
Video games developed in the United States
Video games scored by Alexander Brandon
Video games scored by Inon Zur
Video games featuring female protagonists
Xbox games
Xbox Originals games
Multiplayer and single-player video games